This is an index of lists of superhero films.

 List of American superhero films
 List of highest-grossing superhero films

Superhero
Superhero
Superhero films
Superhero